The Prospect Park Zoo is a  zoo located off Flatbush Avenue on the eastern side of Prospect Park, Brooklyn, New York City. The Prospect Park Zoo is operated by the Wildlife Conservation Society (WCS). In conjunction with the Prospect Park Zoo's operations, the WCS offers children's educational programs, is engaged in restoration of endangered species populations, runs a wildlife theater, and reaches out to the local community through volunteer programs.

Its precursor, the Menagerie, opened in 1890. The present facility first opened as a city zoo on July 3, 1935, and was part of a larger revitalization program of city parks, playgrounds and zoos initiated in 1934 by Parks Commissioner Robert Moses. It was built, in large part, through Civil Works Administration and Works Progress Administration (WPA) labor and funding.

After 53 years of operation as a city zoo run by the New York City Department of Parks and Recreation, Prospect Park Zoo, also colloquially known as "Brooklyn Zoo", closed in June 1988 for reconstruction. The closure signaled the start of a five-year, $37 million renovation program that, save for the exteriors of the 1930s-era buildings, completely replaced the zoo. It was rededicated on October 5, 1993, as the Prospect Park Wildlife Conservation Center, as part of a system of four zoos and one aquarium managed by the WCS, all of which are accredited by the Association of Zoos and Aquariums (AZA).

Features 

The Prospect Park Zoo is part of the Wildlife Conservation Society, an integrated network of four zoos and an aquarium spread throughout New York City. Located at 450 Flatbush Avenue, across from the Brooklyn Botanic Garden, the zoo is situated on a  plot somewhat lower than street level in Prospect Park. Visitors may enter through the Flatbush Avenue entrance or from within Prospect Park, near Leffert's Homestead and the Carousel.

In 2007, 234,000 people visited the Prospect Park Zoo, about the same as the 2006 level of 235,000. , Prospect Park Zoo had 864 animals representing 176 species.

Exhibits

The zoo presents three themed exhibition venues, each housed in a dedicated building.

World of Animals
The World of Animals in the southern quadrant of the zoo, features the Discovery Trail. The trail begins in the World of Animals building, but visitors quickly pass to an outdoor path that winds through the southern third of the zoo. Animals from diverse corners of the globe are shown in settings not unlike their natural habitats. Visitors may find along the trail black-tailed prairie dogs, porcupines, red pandas, emus, dingos, North American river otters, and other animals. Signs often ask challenging questions, reinforcing presentations made in the zoo's Discovery Center, or alert viewers to look for signs of animal habitation. Along one part of the Discovery Trail, young visitors may crawl through "underground burrows" to observation posts roofed with clear, hemispherical observation ports. They may observe prairie dogs in the ground, right in the midst of the animals themselves.

Animal Lifestyles
Animal Lifestyles, in the western quadrant of the zoo, features indoor habitat exhibits. Visitors in the foyer of the building are shown Life in the Water, Life in Air, and Life on Land dioramas. Each diorama holds a carefully controlled environment that features select animals. These central displays broadly relate animals to their surrounds. Exhibits featuring more specific biota branch off from the central foyer. Side exhibits center on pallas cats, cotton-top tamarins, meerkats, emerald tree boas, dwarf mongooses, desert monitors, among others. Some of these exhibits feature critically endangered animals. The Prospect Park Zoo is engaged in breeding species in captivity, a part of the larger wild life recovery program of the Wildlife Conservation Society.

The main Animal Lifestyles exhibit consists of a troop of hamadryas baboons. Zoo visitors may observe the troop in a large glassed-in gallery which looks out into a rocky outcrop. Small caves in the outcrop lead to interior burrows where the animals may avoid inclement weather. The rear wall of the gallery illustrates common forms of baboon signalling and behavior, along with other social aspects of the animals. Ample seating allows visitors to observe the troop.

Animals in our Lives
Animals in our Lives in the northern quadrant of the zoo has both indoor and outdoor exhibits illustrating myriad relationships between animals and people and animal adaptations. The Animals in Art themed area occupies one side of the Animals in Our Lives building.  At the art station, drawing supplies are provided, and young visitors learn to observe wildlife by taking the time to sketch it.  Some animals found here have been the subjects of art through the ages, while other up-close exhibits highlight the inherent beauty and form of certain species.  The other side of the building showcases animals and their adaptations for a variety of survival needs.  Here, visitors learn how colors help animals attract one another, blend into their surroundings or send off warning signals. A small nocturnal area showcases animals who have adapted to life at night.

A small working barn further north of the building contains the Animals in Our Lives exhibit. It is organized around a working barn with sheep, cows, goats, ducks, geese and other animals.

Educational programs 

The zoo hosts educational venues as well as exhibits. These revolve around the Discovery Center, a building with classrooms and laboratories designed to introduce school-age children to investigative practices of environmental and wildlife scientists. The Discovery Center introduces children to laboratory practices; they learn about and use professional laboratory equipment and learn how to integrate what they observe into zoological theory.  These programs are based on educational concepts developed through WIZE (Wildlife Inquiry through Zoo Education), a program developed by Bronx Zoo educators.

The volunteer program at the Prospect Park Zoo engages members of the community; it is a combination outreach and educational program for adults. Volunteer
guides conduct tours for visitors, while volunteer docents augment the educational program. Docents enroll in a four-month training program. Following their graduation, docents assist staff in putting on demonstrations and explaining exhibits.

Facilities 

The zoo grounds and building exteriors were designed by Aymar Embury II. The facility consists of six red brick and lime-stoned trimmed buildings grouped in a semi-circular arrangement around a central courtyard with the sea lion pool occupying the center of the court. The building exteriors date to the 1930s while the interiors were built during the 1989–1993 reconstruction. There is a freestanding wooden barn just north of the circular group of buildings. A set of stairs from the main entrance leads visitors down to zoo level. A small restaurant and the administrative center is immediately to the left, occupying the southeastern quadrant of the zoo. The Discovery Center is immediately to the right, occupying the northeastern quadrant of the zoo. Arrayed in front of the visitor are the three exhibit buildings, The World of Animals to the south, the Animal Lifestyles building, behind the sea lion pool directly in front of the visitor, Animals in our Lives is to the right. Visitors may view the exhibits in any order.

History

Proposal and menagerie 
The original 1866 proposal of Prospect Park featured a "Zoological Garden" on the western flank of the park, near the present Litchfield Villa, but the garden had not been started by the time Frederick Law Olmsted and Calvert Vaux separated from the park in 1874.  This notwithstanding, a few features of the original park design did serve zoological purposes. A Wild Fowl Pond, once occupying the northern quadrant of the zoo grounds, served as a haven for water birds. A Deer Paddock, once occupying the southern quadrants of the zoo grounds, was a penned-in area for deer. In addition, a flock of sheep regularly maintained the grass in the park meadows and were kept in a paddock on the eastern flank of Sullivan Hill, near the now-demolished .

Interest in zoological gardens flowered in the last decade of the 19th century. An informal Menagerie began to take shape within Prospect Park in May 1890 when the newly appointed president of the City of Brooklyn Parks Commission, George V. Brower, donated "three young cinnamon bears." State Treasurer Harry Adams followed with a donation of three white deer, establishing a pattern. It was mainly through donations of animals by rich or prominent individuals that the Menagerie grew. By 1893, one observer noted that “seven seals arrived, one buffalo, from the estate of Samuel B. Duryea, three red foxes, three bears, one sacred cow, two white deer, five red deer, seven seals, and twelve to fifteen peacocks."

The animals were kept in pens on Sullivan Hill, situated across the East Drive from the zoo's present location, near the sheep paddock and northeast of the Dairy Farmhouse. Of the original zoological facilities in the park, the Deer Paddock, located near the present Carousel, was converted into a meadow and the deer were moved to the new Menagerie, The Wild Fowl Pond remained, located on the east side of the park in a low area now forming the northern part of the zoo. The Menagerie continued to accrue animals in the first decades of the 20th century. These were generally donated by prominent individuals and institutions and formed a varied collection of specimens both native to North America and other regions of the world. A two-story brick building was opened in the Menagerie in 1916, housing monkeys, some small mammals, and several birds.

Modern zoo creation 

After assuming office in January 1934, New York City Mayor Fiorello La Guardia tapped Robert Moses to head a newly unified Parks Department. Moses soon prepared extensive plans to reconstruct the city's parks, renovate existing facilities and create new swimming pools, zoos, playgrounds and parks. Moses acquired substantial Civil Works Administration, and later, Works Progress Administration funding and soon embarked upon an eight-year citywide construction program, relieving some of the high unemployment in New York City in this Depression year.

Plans for the new Prospect Park Zoo, prepared by Aymar Embury II, were announced in March 1934. The area between the Wild Fowl Pond and former Deer Paddock on the east side of the park, situated across the East Drive from the Menagerie, was chosen as the site for the new zoo. Architect Embury designed a half circle of six brick buildings centered on a seal pool. Built of red brick with limestone trim, the buildings featured bas-relief scenes from Rudyard Kipling's The Jungle Book.

Five sculptors executed a total of thirteen such scenes, not only on the front and back walls of zoo buildings, but also on all four sides of both brick entrance shelters at Flatbush Avenue. However, the positioning of some of the bas-reliefs makes them less accessible than others. Dedicated on July 3, 1935, as the Prospect Park Zoo, the buildings constituted an integrated facility and were seen as a great improvement over the somewhat haphazardly developed Menagerie. The zoo featured an extensive bear pit, a seal pool, a lion's house (the current Animals in our Lives building) an elephant's house (the current Animal Lifestyles building) and a house for monkeys, birds, and horned animals (now the World of Animals building). With the completion of the new zoo, The Dairy Farmhouse, sheep paddock, and Menagerie were demolished and the sheep flock was replaced with mechanical mowers. The site of the old Menagerie has since been allowed to revert to forest land.

Decline 
For the next fifty years, the zoo served as a showcase of large animals from far away places, appealing to a sense of wonder. An estimated one million people visited the Prospect Park Zoo annually prior to World War II, but attendance gradually declined, reaching about a half million by the early 1980s. Around this time, the facility showed signs of deterioration. Writing in New York Magazine in late 1970, writer Erik Sanberg-Diment termed the zoo the 'rattiest' in New York – "in the literal sense of the word. (I've never been there without seeing several rodents romping in the bear lair)". He reported that "Vultch", a Southern United States black vulture which was one of the zoo's earliest residents "…is still there, looking down his beak at visitors littering the walks, and celebrating his 35th anniversary in the same old cage." A decade later, a New York Times reporter visiting the zoo noted that "...an Asiatic Black Bear lay on a rock a short distance from a guard rail. A shattered wine bottle, a cracked stick, and a number of empty beer cans were strewn about the ground a few feet in front of him. 'How many times have I seen a bear lift his foot and leave a bloody foot print?' said John Kinzig, a park supervisor at the Prospect Park Zoo. 'Vandalism is a major problem, and deterioration is overtaking repairs.'"

During the 1970s, there were multiple incidents involving animal injuries or deaths at the Prospect Park Zoo. This included the scalding death of a monkey in 1975, allegedly by a zoo employee, as well as an acting zoo director who was accused of shooting at pigeons and killing zoo animals. A zoo employee also locked himself in a monkey enclosure for several hours in 1974 to protest the deaths of ten animals. These incidents, as well as several others at the Central Park Zoo, prompted protests by animal-rights groups who wanted to close the two zoos and move the animals to the larger Bronx Zoo. After fifteen years of sporadic conversations, the Koch administration and the NY Zoological Society (now Wildlife Conservation Society) signed a fifty-year agreement in April 1980, wherein the Central, Prospect, and Queens Zoos would be administered by the Society.

Activists were pressing for major renovations of the zoo, which, in 1983, was rated by the Humane Society of the United States as one of the "10 worst" zoos in the country. Others felt that a zoo was not in keeping with the original design of Prospect Park and urged its complete removal from the grounds. The May 1987 mauling death of Juan Perez, an 11-year-old boy scaling the fence to the polar bear pit, underscored the difficulties with the fifty-year-old facility. By late summer 1987, an $18-million, 2.5-year renovation plan was put forth to renovate Prospect Park Zoo and coordinate its venue with other facilities to avoid redundant programming. Prospect Park Zoo was slated to specialize in children programs and house smaller, non-aggressive animal species.

Renovation of a re-purposed zoo 
The Prospect Park Zoo closed to the public in June 1988. Over the next six months, new homes were found for the displaced animals in other zoos throughout the US. Demolition was managed by the Parks Department and began in June 1989, commencing what became nearly a five-year, $37 million effort, overrunning initial estimates by two years and $19 million. The exteriors of the Aymar Embury buildings were preserved, but badly deteriorated interiors were gutted, pits and cages were demolished, and new structures were built. The facilities were turned over to the NY Zoological Society in April 1993. The Society aimed to designate each of its three small zoos with a specific purpose. The Central Park Zoo would be focused toward conservation; the Prospect Park Zoo would be primarily a children's zoo; and the Queens Zoo would become a zoo with North American animals.

A further six months were needed to repopulate the zoo, prepare exhibits, and ready the facility for the public. The re-purposed zoo opened on October 5, 1993, and renamed the "Prospect Park Wildlife Conservation Center". The Zoological Society hoped that the new name would suggest that the "Wildlife Conservation Center" was far more than a mere "zoo"; it was indeed a facility designed to preserve animal species. This name change coincided with the renaming of the zoological society to the "Wildlife Conservation Society".

The programs of the new center were geared toward educating children. Classrooms for the Discovery Center were housed in a dedicated building on the north wing of the zoo. Exhibits housed smaller species, eschewing elephants, tigers, and lions, and augmented displays with interactive exhibits. The public, however, continued to call the facility "The Prospect Park Zoo", and over the ensuing thirteen years the old name quietly stuck. Even in WCS literature "Prospect Park Zoo" is now used interchangeably with the new name.

Budget issues
The Wildlife Conservation Society, which supports the Prospect Park Zoo through a combination of private funds and subsidies from the city, is vulnerable to funding shortfalls such as the one on April 15, 2003, when Mayor Michael Bloomberg published his "doomsday budget" proposal for the fiscal year beginning in July 2003. Among other cuts to help close an overall $3.8 billion budget deficit, the Mayor proposed to cut all city funding for the Prospect Park Zoo and the Queens Zoo, as well as trim funding for the New York Aquarium and the Bronx Zoo. The two zoos were the smallest among the facilities managed by the Wildlife Conservation Society, and had the lowest annual attendance rates, approximately 200,000 for each threatened zoo. In contrast, the Bronx Zoo boasted annual attendance of two million and the Central Park Zoo enjoyed one million visitors annually. Over the next two months, the fate of the two zoos hung in limbo while the city's executive branch and City Council hammered out a compromise budget. While there were a number of items on the budget, the zoo closures remained among the more visible of anticipated losses.

In the middle of June, City Council Speaker Gifford Miller visited the zoo, and in a press conference outlined some of the pragmatic consequences of closure: a savings estimated by the city of $6 million for both facilities that would be offset by a WCS estimated expenditure of $8 million, to decommission facilities and — on short notice — find homes for 160 displaced animals. If the estimates were correct, reasoning went, it would be cheaper to run the zoos than to shut them down.

By the start of the new fiscal year in July 2003, the approved budget restored a reduced funding level to the affected WCS facilities. To keep the Prospect Park and Queens Zoos open, the WCS had to close two classroom-based instructional programs, lay off the supporting full- and part-time instructors, and double admission fees. Funding levels for the Wildlife Conservation Society were restored in the 2007 city budget, though vulnerability to shortfalls remain. In the opening months of 2009, the WCS itself faced the prospect of losing its fiscal year 2010 New York State funding. While not citing specifics concerning Prospect Park Zoo, the Wildlife Conservation Society reported in the NY Daily News that the proposed cuts would involve  "'layoffs [that] would cut across the board,' and include 'front-line workers' in sales, groundskeeping and other positions, and include both union and nonunion positions".

See also 
Heart of Brooklyn
Prospect Park
Wildlife Conservation Society

References

Notes

Citations

External links

 Description of the zoo at the Prospect Park Alliance web site
 Wildlife Conservation Society's Prospect Park Zoo web site

 Map of Prospect Park Zoo (Portable Document Format - PDF)
 Historical images of the Menagerie and Prospect Park Zoo
Prospect Park Zoo on zooinstitutes.com

Zoos in New York City
Prospect Park (Brooklyn)
Entertainment venues in Brooklyn
Robert Moses projects
Works Progress Administration in New York City
Tourist attractions in Brooklyn
Wildlife Conservation Society